Julia Evelyn Morley  (née Pritchard; born 25 October 1939) is an English businesswoman, charity worker, and former model. She is the chairman and CEO of the Miss World Organization, which organizes the Miss World  and Mister World. She is the widow of Miss World creator, the late Eric Morley who was in charge of organizing the pageant from its inception in 1951 until his death in 2000.

Life and career

Born in London, she worked as a model, and met Eric Morley, then a director of Mecca Dancing, at a dance hall in Leeds; the couple married in 1960. She became chairman of Miss World after her husband died  in 2000.

As chairman of Miss World, she introduced "Beauty With A Purpose", which raises money in support of sick and disadvantaged children. In 2009, Morley used the opening of the Miss World Festival to launch the Variety International Children’s Fund with a Charity Dinner which raised over $400,000 for nutritional, educational and medical projects in Haiti. 
She was conferred with the Priyadarshini Award for her ‘Save the Children’ campaign. In 2016, Morley received the Variety Humanitarian Award.

Morley was appointed Commander of the Order of the British Empire (CBE) in the 2022 Birthday Honours for charitable and voluntary services to disadvantaged people in the UK and abroad.

References

External links
 
 

1939 births
Living people
host
Beauty pageant owners
English female models
British chairpersons of corporations
20th-century English businesswomen
20th-century English businesspeople
English humanitarians
Commanders of the Order of the British Empire
21st-century English businesswomen
21st-century English businesspeople